The Nut Cracker is a 1920 comedy novel by the American writer Frederic S. Isham. It was publisher by the Indianapolis-based Bobbs-Merrill Company. After an accident a man pretends to have lost his memory and enjoys a series of adventures.

Adaptation
In 1926 it was made into a silent film The Nutcracker directed by Lloyd Ingraham and starring Edward Everett Horton, Mae Busch and Harry Myers.

References

Bibliography
 Goble, Alan. The Complete Index to Literary Sources in Film. Walter de Gruyter, 1999.
 Smith, Geoffrey D. American Fiction, 1901-1925: A Bibliography. Cambridge University Press, 1997.

1920 American novels
Novels by Frederic S. Isham
American comedy novels
Bobbs-Merrill Company books
American novels adapted into films